The Head of the Republic of Ingushetia, formerly President of the Republic of Ingushetia, is the highest office within the Government of Ingushetia, Russia. The Head is elected by Parliament of Ingushetia. Term of service is five years.

History 
On 4 June 1992, the Supreme Soviet of Russia adopted Act No. 2927-1 "On the formation of the Ingush Republic within the Russian Federation". Checheno-Ingushetia was officially divided into Ingushetia and Chechnya. On 2 November 1992, by the presidential decree, a state of emergency was introduced on the territory of the future Ingushetia and the Provisional Administration was created.

On February 28, 1993, elections of the President of the Ingush Republic were held, at which only one candidate was participating, Major General Ruslan Aushev. Having received the support of 99.94% of the voters, he became the first president of Ingushetia. On March 7, the inauguration of the first President of Ingushetia took place in the House of Culture of Nazran. On December 29, 2001, Aushev announced his early resignation.

On April 7, 2002, early presidential elections were held in the Republic of Ingushetia. Eight candidates applied for this post, but none of them received more than 50% of the vote. On April 28, 2002, Murat Zyazikov was elected in the second round with 53,15%. In 2004, at the initiative of the President of Russia Vladimir Putin, the elections of governors were canceled in favor of appointment of President's suggested candidates by the regional legislatures.

Since January 1, 2011, the position has been renamed from "President of the Republic of Ingushetia" to "Head of the Republic of Ingushetia". On June 1, 2012, a federal law came into force providing for the return of direct gubernatorial elections in Russia. On April 2, 2013, five months before the expected elections in Ingushetia, Russian President Vladimir Putin signed a law according to which the regions were given the right to independently determine the procedure for electing a head of the region. On May 7, members of the People's Assembly of Ingushetia voted to abolish direct elections of the head of the republic.

List

Timeline

References

 
Politics of Ingushetia
Ingushetia